Bleeding Oath is the eponymous debut EP from English progressive metal band Bleeding Oath, released independently on February 25, 2012 in both physical and digital format. The band had begun recording the EP shortly before being named Terrorizer's Unsigned Band of 2011. The first track, "Mountains", was premiered on the Metal Hammer Podcast hosted by Stephen Hill and Merlin Alderslade, with "What Fortune Gives" (a track that had previously appeared on the Ghosts of the Past demo) being streamed by Terrorizer. The EP has received positive feedback from critics, including Metal Hammer writer Dom Lawson. The track "Mountains" featured on Terrorizer's Fear Candy 106 CD, which came free with the May 2012 issue of the magazine.

Track listing

Personnel
Robert Heyg - vocals, guitar
Micah Douglas - guitar
Harrison White - drums
Matt "Moat" Lowe - bass guitar

References

2012 EPs
Bleeding Oath albums